The following is a list of notable deaths in June 2010.

Entries for each day are listed alphabetically by surname. A typical entry lists information in the following sequence:
 Name, age, country of citizenship at birth, subsequent country of citizenship (if applicable), reason for notability, cause of death (if known), and reference.

June 2010

1
Omar Andréen, 87, Norwegian painter, graphic artist, and illustrator.
Freddie Burdette, 73, American baseball player (Chicago Cubs).
Vladimír Bystrov, 74, Czech writer and translator, recipient of the Order of Tomáš Garrigue Masaryk.
Chinook Pass, 31, American Thoroughbred racehorse, euthanized.
Arturo Falaschi, 77, Italian geneticist.
John Hagart, 72, Scottish football player and manager.
Heather the Leather, 50, British scaleless carp, old age.
Arthur A. Link, 96, American politician. U.S. Representative (1971–1973), Governor of North Dakota (1973–1981).
Roger Manderscheid, 77, Luxembourgian author.
Miss Ellie, 17, American Chinese Crested Dog, winner of title World's Ugliest Dog.
Kazuo Ohno, 103, Japanese dancer, respiratory failure.
Frank Pike, 80, Canadian football player and manager, heart failure.
Joseph Strick, 86, American film director and producer, heart failure.
Lobi Traoré, 48, Malian musician.
Andrei Voznesensky, 77, Russian poet and writer.

2
Dick Bird, 77, British Anglican priest.
Eleanor Taylor Bland, 65, American crime fiction writer.
Floribert Chebeya, 46, Congolese human rights activist.
Dorothy DeBorba, 85, American actress (Our Gang), emphysema and lung disease.
Tony DiPreta, 88, American cartoonist, (Joe Palooka, Rex Morgan, M.D.), respiratory and cardiac arrest.
John W. Douglas, 88, American civil rights advocate, complications from a stroke.
Joe Gardi, 71, American football coach, stroke.
Kovilan, 86, Indian novelist, respiratory disease.
Marguerite Narbel, 92, Swiss biologist and politician, member of the Grand Council of Vaud.
Garry Purdham, 31, English rugby league player (Workington Town), shot.
Ri Je-gang, 80, North Korean politician, First Deputy Head of the Organization and Guidance Department of the Workers' Party of Korea, car accident.
John Richardson, 77, Canadian politician, MP for Perth—Wellington—Waterloo (1993–1997); Perth—Middlesex (1997–2002), Alzheimer's disease.
António Alva Rosa Coutinho, 84, Portuguese admiral and politician, Governor-General of Angola, after long illness.
Michael Schildberger, 72, Australian journalist, prostate cancer.
Gabriele Sella, 47, Italian Olympic cyclist.
Giuseppe Taddei, 93, Italian opera singer.
Yoo Chang-soon, 92, South Korean politician, Prime Minister (1982).

3
João Aguiar, 66, Portuguese writer and journalist.
Vladimir Arnold, 72, Russian mathematician, peritonitis.
Frank Bernasko, 79, Ghanaian soldier and politician.
Bill Clark, 80, New Zealand rugby player, after long illness.
Frank Evans, 86, American politician, member of the U.S. House of Representatives from Colorado (1965–1979).
John Hedgecoe, 78, British photographer.
Robert Hudson, 90, British broadcaster.
Paul Malliavin, 84, French mathematician, creator of Malliavin calculus.
Rue McClanahan, 76, American actress (The Golden Girls, Maude, Starship Troopers), stroke.
Luigi Padovese, 63, Italian Roman Catholic prelate, Vicar of Anatolia and chairman of the Turkish Bishops' Conference (since 2004), stabbed.
Pance Pondaag, 59, Indonesian pop singer and songwriter, complications from a stroke.
Pétur Sigurgeirsson, 91, Icelandic prelate, Bishop of Iceland (1981–1989).
Emory C. Swank, 88, American diplomat, Ambassador to Cambodia (1970–1973).
Hasan Tiro, 84, Indonesian politician, founder of the Free Aceh Movement, multiple organ dysfunction syndrome.
Leonard S. Unger, 92, American diplomat, Ambassador to Laos (1962–1964), Thailand (1967), and the Republic of China (1974–1979).
Charlie Wedemeyer, 64, American football player and coach, complications from amyotrophic lateral sclerosis.

4
Raymond Allchin, 86, British archaeologist.
Bill Ashenfelter, 85, American Olympic athlete.
Frank Ballard, 80, American puppeteer and educator, complications from Parkinson's disease.
Himan Brown, 99, American radio producer (CBS Radio Mystery Theater).
Jim Copeland, 65, American football player, cancer.
Marianne Elser Crowder, 104, American oldest Girl Scout, pancreatic cancer.
Amado Crowley, 79/80, British occult writer and magician. (Death announced by this date)
Richard Dunn, 73, American character actor (Tim and Eric Awesome Show, Great Job!), stroke.
David Foster, 90, British naval pilot.
Jack Harrison, 97, British air force officer, last survivor of Stalag Luft III.
Richard P. Lindsay, 84, American Mormon leader and politician (Utah House of Representatives, 1972–1977), cancer.
Syd Luyt, 84, South African Olympic runner.
David Markson, 82, American writer (Wittgenstein's Mistress).
William Miranda Marín, 69, Puerto Rican politician, mayor of Caguas (1997–2010), pancreatic cancer.
Andi Meriem Matalatta, 52, Indonesian pop singer, complications from diabetes.
Carlos Francisco Martins Pinheiro, 85, Portuguese Roman Catholic prelate.
Hennadiy Popovych, 37, Ukrainian footballer (Zenit, Shakhtar), cardiac arrest.
Norman Rothfield, 98, Australian peace and labour activist.
Ray Smith, 80, Australian Olympic athlete.
Chuck Taliano, 65, American marine, featured on recruitment poster, multiple myeloma.
Eddie Washington, 56, American politician, member of the Illinois House of Representatives (2003–2010), heart attack.
John Werket, 85, American Olympic speed skater.
John Wooden, 99, American basketball coach (UCLA, 1948–1975).

5
Esma Agolli, 81, Albanian actress, cardiac arrest.
Braulio Alonso, 93, American educator.
Sir Neil Anderson, 83, New Zealand admiral, Chief of Defence Staff (1980–1983).
Danny Bank, 87, American jazz saxophonist, clarinetist, and flautist.
Robert C. Bergenheim, 86, American founder of Boston Business Journal.
Angus Douglas-Hamilton, 15th Duke of Hamilton, 71, British peer and racing driver, dementia.
Robert Healy, 84, American journalist, executive editor (The Boston Globe), stroke.
Stephen Clancy Hill, 34, American pornographic actor and murderer, suicide by jumping from cliff.
Jacob Milgrom, 87, American rabbi and biblical scholar, brain hemorrhage.
Finian Monahan, 86, Irish Roman Catholic friar and priest, Superior General (1973–1979), pneumonia.
Arne Nordheim, 78, Norwegian contemporary classical composer.
Tony Peluso, 60, American musician and record producer (The Carpenters), heart disease.
Steven Reuther, 58, American film producer (Dirty Dancing, Pretty Woman, The Ugly Truth), cancer.
Robert Wussler, 73, American businessman, co-founder of CNN, after long illness.

6
Mabi de Almeida, 46, Angolan football manager, after long illness.
Jack Beeson, 88, American contemporary classical music composer, heart failure.
Marvin Isley, 56, American bassist (The Isley Brothers, Isley-Jasper-Isley), complications of diabetes.
Dana Key, 56, American musician (DeGarmo and Key), ruptured blood clot.
Abraham Nathanson, 80, American graphic designer and author, co-inventor of Bananagrams, cancer.
Robert B. Radnitz, 85, American film producer (Cross Creek, My Side of the Mountain, Sounder), complications from a stroke.
Ladislav Smoljak, 78, Czech film and theatre director, after long illness.
Jerry Stephenson, 66, American baseball player (Boston Red Sox), lung cancer.
Paul Wunderlich, 83, German artist.

7
José Albi, 88, Spanish poet.
Paul Bell, 59, American politician, member of the Iowa House of Representatives (since 1993), stomach cancer.
Stuart Cable, 40, Welsh drummer (Stereophonics), accidental asphyxiation.
*Chai Zemin, 93, Chinese diplomat.
Mordechai Eliyahu, 81, Israeli rabbi, Sephardi Chief Rabbi of Israel (1983–1993).
Jorge Ginarte, 70, Argentine football manager.
Ndoc Gjetja, 66, Albanian poet, after long illness.
Alex Hastie, 74, British rugby player.
Eric Mason, 83, British actor (Hot Fuzz, A Man for All Seasons, Doctor Who).
Arsen Naydyonov, 68, Russian football coach (Zhemchuzhina, Novorossiysk).
Oliver N'Goma, 51, Gabonese singer and guitarist, renal failure.
Omar Rayo, 82, Colombian painter and sculptor, heart attack.
Viana Júnior, 68, Brazilian comedian, multiple organ dysfunction syndrome.
Adriana Xenides, 54, Argentine-born Australian television personality (Wheel of Fortune), ruptured intestine.

8
Tony Cennamo, 76, American disc jockey (WBUR), after long illness.
Margaret Delacourt-Smith, Baroness Delacourt-Smith of Alteryn, 94, British politician and life peer.
Dan Eastman, 64, American politician and businessman, Utah State Senator (2000–2008), heart failure.
Joan Hinton, 88, American nuclear physicist, abdominal aneurysm.
Porfi Jiménez, 82, Dominican-born Venezuelan musician, arranger, composer and bandleader.
Plamen Maslarov, 60, Bulgarian film director.
Stephen Rivers, 55, American publicist and political activist, prostate cancer.
Ismael Blas Rolón Silvero, 96, Paraguayan Roman Catholic prelate, Archbishop of Asunción (1970–1989).
Crispian St. Peters, 71, British pop singer ("The Pied Piper", "You Were on My Mind"), after long illness.
Andreas Voutsinas, 79, Greek actor and stage director.

9
Epaminondas José de Araújo, 88, Brazilian Roman Catholic prelate, Bishop of Palmeira dos Índios (1978–1984).
Ken Brown, 70, British guitarist (The Quarrymen).
Fadzil Mahmood, 73, Malaysian politician, speaker of the Perlis State Assembly (1986–1990).
Melbert Ford, 49, American convicted murderer, execution by lethal injection.
Christine Johnson, 98, American opera singer and actress.
Bobby Kromm, 82, Canadian ice hockey coach (Detroit Red Wings, Winnipeg Jets), complications from colorectal cancer.
Joseph Crescent McKinney, 81, American Roman Catholic auxiliary bishop of Grand Rapids (1968–2001).
Marina Semyonova, 101, Russian prima ballerina (Bolshoi Ballet).
Mohamed Sylla, 39, Guinean footballer (Willem II, Martigues, Guinea), cancer.
Oleksandr Zinchenko, 53, Ukrainian politician.

10
Manute bol, 47, basketball legend, kidney failure.
David Ellison, 70, British actor (Juliet Bravo).
Ginette Garcin, 82, French actress, cancer.
Ferdinand Oyono, 80, Cameroonian writer and government minister, Minister of Foreign Affairs (1992–1997).
Sigmar Polke, 69, German painter and photographer, cancer.
Basil Schott, 70, American Byzantine Catholic friar, Metropolitan of the Byzantine Catholic Archeparchy of Pittsburgh (since 2002), cancer.

11
Bernie Andrews, 76, British radio producer.
Maria Aurora, 72, Portuguese journalist, poet, novelist, children's writer and television presenter.
Henri Cuq, 68, French politician.
Shunsuke Ikeda, 68, Japanese actor (Kikaider 01, Ultraman Mebius & Ultraman Brothers), stomach cancer.
Kip Deville, 7, American Thoroughbred racehorse, euthanized.
Norman Macrae, 86, British journalist, deputy editor of The Economist (1965–1988).
William J. Mitchell, 65, American architect and urban designer (MIT Media Lab), complications of cancer.
Johnny Parker, 80, British jazz pianist ("Bad Penny Blues").
Andrzej Piątkowski, 75, Polish sabreur, Olympic medallist (1956, 1960 and 1964).
Fred Plum, 86, American neurologist, developed the term "persistent vegetative state", primary progressive aphasia.
Badal Rahman, 61, Bangladeshi film director and political activist.
Dariusz Ratajczak, 47, Polish holocaust denier (body discovered on this date).
Bus Whitehead, 82, American basketball player (Nebraska Cornhuskers)
James N. Wood, 69, American museum director.

12
Anne Chapman, 88, French-born American ethnologist.
John Crampton, 88, British RAF pilot.
Daisy D'ora, 97, German actress and socialite.
Richard Keynes, 90, British physiologist.
Rik Levins, 60, American comic book artist (Captain America, The Avengers).
Chuck Lyda, 57, American slalom and sprint canoer, stomach cancer.
Félix Maldonado, 72, American baseball player and scout (Boston Red Sox), cancer.
Fuat Mansurov, 82, Kazakh-born Russian conductor (Bolshoi Theatre).
Les Richter, 79, American football player (Los Angeles Rams), member of Pro Football Hall of Fame, and auto racing official, NASCAR head of operations, brain aneurysm.
Egon Ronay, 94, Hungarian-born British restaurateur and restaurant critic.
Philip Selznick, 91, American lawyer, author and sociologist.
Grizzly Smith, 77, American professional wrestler, Alzheimer's disease.
Jerzy Stefan Stawiński, 88, Polish screenwriter and film director.
Al Williamson, 79, American comic book artist (Secret Agent X-9, Superman, Flash Gordon).

13
Combo Ayouba, 57-58, Comorian army officer, Coordinator of the Transitional Military Committee (1995), shot.
E. F. Bleiler, 90, American science fiction author.
Thomas S. Buechner, 83, American museum director, lymphoma.
Dave Broda, 65, Canadian politician, member of the Legislative Assembly of Alberta (1997–2004), car crash.
Jimmy Dean, 81, American country music singer (Big Bad John), actor and businessman (Jimmy Dean Foods), natural causes.
Abbas Djoussouf, 68, Comorian politician, Prime Minister (1998–1999).
Ernest Fleischmann, 85, German-born American impresario, executive director of the Los Angeles Philharmonic.
Ernie Johnson, 84, American football and basketball player (UCLA).
Emilio Macias, 76, Filipino politician, Governor of Negros Oriental, liver cancer.
F. James McDonald, 87, American businessman, President of General Motors (1981–1987).
Tom Stith, 71, American basketball player (New York Knicks).
Sergei Tretyakov, 53, Russian intelligence officer and defector, former SVR agent.
Nelson Wallulatum, 84, American Wasco tribe leader, chief of the Wasco Indians (since 1959), founder of The Museum at Warm Springs.
Jonathan Wolken, 60, American artistic director, co-founder of Pilobolus, complications from stem cell transplant.

14
Oscar Azócar, 45, Venezuelan baseball player (New York Yankees, San Diego Padres).
Teshome Gabriel, 70, Ethiopian-born American cinema scholar, cardiac arrest.
Resi Hammerer, 85, Austrian Olympic alpine skier, bronze medalist (1948 Winter Olympics).
Richard Herrmann, 90, Norwegian journalist, writer and radio personality (NRK), after long illness.
Jiří Kavan, 66, Czech Olympic silver medal-winning (1972) handball player.
Leonid Kizim, 68, Ukrainian Soviet cosmonaut.
Ted Lowry, 90, American boxer, heart failure.
Manohar Malgonkar, 96, Indian author.
Luis Arturo Mondragón, 53, Honduran journalist, shot.
Giacinto Prandelli, 96, Italian operatic tenor.
Damian Silvera, 35, American Olympic soccer player.
Jaroslav Škarvada, 85, Czech Roman Catholic prelate, auxiliary bishop of Prague (1982–2002).

15
Thomas L. Ashley, 87, American politician, U.S. Representative for Ohio (1955–1981).
Charles Thomas Beer, 94, Canadian chemist.
Brian Bethell, 45, American spree killer.
Bekim Fehmiu, 74, Serbian actor (I Even Met Happy Gypsies), suspected suicide by gunshot.
Phil Gordon, 94, American character actor and dialect coach (The Beverly Hillbillies, Green Acres, Petticoat Junction).
Charlie Hickcox, 63, American Olympic swimmer, gold and silver medalist (1968 Summer Olympics), cancer.
Heidi Kabel, 95, German stage actress.
Tadashi Kawashima, 41, Japanese manga artist (Alive: The Final Evolution), liver cancer.
Arnold Kramish, 87, American physicist, neurological disorder.
Wendell Logan, 69, American composer.
Busi Mhlongo, 62, South African musician, cancer.
Natalia Tolstaya, 67, Russian writer and translator.

16
Joselito Agustin, 33-34, Filipino journalist, shot.
Marc Bazin, 78, Haitian politician, Acting President and Prime Minister (1992–1993).
Peter Brunette, 66, American film critic (The Hollywood Reporter), heart attack.
Bill Dixon, 84, American jazz musician.
Maureen Forrester, 79, Canadian opera singer, complications of Alzheimer's disease.
Amedeo Guillet, 101, Italian army officer.
Bob Hartman, 72, American baseball player, post-surgical infection.
Allen Hoey, 57, American poet, Pulitzer Prize nominee, heart attack. 
Ronald Neame, 99, British film director (The Poseidon Adventure) and screenwriter.
Jim Nestor, 90, Australian Olympic cyclist.
Corso Salani, 48, Italian actor and film director, stroke.
Garry Shider, 56, American musician (Parliament-Funkadelic), complications from brain and lung cancer.
P. G. Viswambharan, 63, Indian film director, after long illness.

17
Hannah Atkins, 86, American politician, Secretary of State of Oklahoma (1987–1991) and State Representative (1969–1981), cancer.
Elżbieta Czyżewska, 72, Polish-born American actress, esophageal cancer.
Hans Dichand, 89, Austrian journalist and newspaper publisher.
Sebastian Horsley, 47, British artist, heroin overdose.
Anjali Mendes, 64, Indian model.
K. S. Rajah, 80, Singaporean juridical official, Judicial Commissioner of the Supreme Court, cancer.
Andy Ripley, 62, British rugby player, prostate cancer.

18
Trent Acid, 29, American professional wrestler, accidental drug overdose.
Marcel Bigeard, 94, French general and politician.
Bogdan Bogdanović, 87, Serbian architect, urbanist, and politician, Mayor of Belgrade (1982–1986), heart attack.
Waldemar Ciesielczyk, 51, Polish Olympic fencer.
Joe Deal, 62, American photographer, bladder cancer.
Bidya Debbarma, 94, Indian politician.
Robert Galambos, 96, American neuroscientist, discovered how bats navigate, heart failure.
Ronnie Lee Gardner, 49, American convicted murderer, executed by firing squad.
Tom Nicon, 22, French model, suicide by jumping.
Kalmen Opperman, 90, American clarinetist, heart failure.
José Saramago, 87, Portuguese novelist, playwright and journalist, Nobel Prize winner for literature, cancer.
Hans Joachim Sewering, 94, German physician, member of the Waffen-SS (1933–1945).
Hadelin Viellevoye, 95, Belgian footballer

19
Manute Bol, 47, Sudanese basketball player and activist, kidney failure and Stevens–Johnson syndrome.
Anwar Chowdhry, 86, Pakistani sports official, President of the International Boxing Association (1986–2006), heart attack.
Jack Cloud, 85, American football player.
Ned Endress, 92, American basketball player.
Marvin L. Esch, 82, American politician, U.S. Representative from Michigan (1967–1977).
John Ferruggio, 84, American in-flight director, led evacuation of Pan Am Flight 93, organ failure.
Mohammed Ali Hammadi, 46, Lebanese militant (Hezbollah), drone strike.
Robin Matthews, 83, British economist and chess problemist.
Carlos Monsiváis, 72, Mexican writer and journalist, respiratory failure.
Vince O'Brien, 91, American character actor (Dark Shadows, Guiding Light, Law & Order).
Alfred Parsons, 85, Australian diplomat, High Commissioner to the United Kingdom (1983–1987).
Anthony Quinton, Baron Quinton, 85, British philosopher and life peer.
Jesús Manuel Lara Rodríguez, 48, Mexican politician, mayor of Guadalupe, Chihuahua, shot.
Dame Angela Rumbold, 77, British politician, MP for Mitcham and Morden (1982–1997).
Nico Smith, 81, South African minister and anti-apartheid activist, heart attack.
Ken Talbot, 59, Australian businessman, CEO of Macarthur Coal (1995–2008), plane crash.
Paul Thiebaud, 49, American gallerist, colon cancer.
Ursula Thiess, 86, German artist and actress (Bengal Brigade).
Jack Tobin, 90, American anthropologist, expert on the Marshall Islands.
Chris Welles, 72, American business journalist, Alzheimer's disease.

20
Dwight Armstrong, 58, American anti-Vietnam War protester, Sterling Hall bomber, lung cancer.
Sir William Boulton, 3rd Baronet, 98, British barrister.
Vladimír Dlouhý, 52, Czech actor.
*Lai Sun Cheung, 59, Hong Kong football coach, lung cancer.
Raymond Parks, 96, American auto racer, two-time NASCAR car owner points champion.
Abdolmalek Rigi, 27, Iranian Sunni Islamist militant, leader of Jundallah, execution by hanging.
Roberto Rosato, 66, Italian footballer.
Gundibail Sunderam, 80, Indian cricketer, after a short illness.
Albert Webster, 85, British Olympic athlete.
Harry B. Whittington, 94, British palaeontologist.

21
Jesús Álvarez Amaya, 84, Mexican painter and graphic artist, cancer.
Russell Ash, 64, British writer and publisher (The Top 10 of Everything).
Irwin Barker, 58, Canadian comedian and television writer (This Hour Has 22 Minutes, Rick Mercer Report), leiomyosarcoma.
Wilfried Feldenkirchen, 62, German economic historian and project manager (Siemens), car crash.
Rosemary Gillespie, 69, Australian human rights activist and lawyer, stroke.
Bob Greene, 92, American Makah tribe elder, natural causes.
Hector Laing, Baron Laing of Dunphail, 87, British businessman and life peer.
Allison Parks, 68, American model (Playboy, October 1965) and actress.
Ingeborg Pertmayr, 63, Austrian Olympic diver.
Henrique Walter Pinotti, 81, Brazilian physician, cancer.
William S. Richardson, 90, American jurist and politician, Lieutenant Governor of Hawaii (1962–1966), Chief Justice (Hawaii Supreme Court, 1966–1982).
Hermann Gonçalves Schatzmayr, 75, Brazilian virologist, Fundação Oswaldo Cruz researcher, multiple organ dysfunction syndrome.
İlhan Selçuk, 85, Turkish lawyer, journalist and writer, editor-in-chief of Cumhuriyet, multiple organ dysfunction syndrome.
Chris Sievey, 54, British comedian and musician (Frank Sidebottom), lung cancer.
Tam White, 67, British musician and actor, heart attack.
With Approval, 24, Canadian Thoroughbred racehorse, Canadian Triple Crown winner (1989), euthanized.
Larry Jon Wilson, 69, American songwriter and musician, stroke.

22
Pamela Ascherson, 87, British sculptor, painter and illustrator.
Peppy Blount, 85, American football player (Texas Longhorns) and line judge.
Robin Bush, 67, British historian (Time Team).
Gerald Heaney, 92, American jurist, United States Court of Appeals (1966–2006).
Marie-Luise Jahn, 92, German activist, member of the anti-Nazi resistance movement White Rose.
Aileen Osofsky, 83, American community leader, philanthropist and bridge player (ACBL), complications from leukemia.
Amokrane Oualiken, 77, Algerian footballer.
Pennant Roberts, 69, British television director.
Manfred Römbell, 68, German writer, after long illness.
Wayne Stephenson, 65, Canadian professional and Olympic bronze medal-winning (1968) ice hockey player.
Levern Tart, 68, American basketball player (Oakland Oaks, New York Nets).
Tracy Wright, 50, Canadian actress, pancreatic cancer.

23
Anthony Adrian Allen, 96, British entomologist.
Ron Atchison, 80, Canadian football player (Saskatchewan Roughriders), heart failure.
Jörg Berger, 65, German football manager, bowel cancer.
John Burton, 95, Australian diplomat and academic.
Michael Cobb, 93, British Army officer and railway historian.
Dermot Earley, 62, Irish Chief of Staff of the Defence Forces (2004–2010), after short illness.
Allyn Ferguson, 85, American television composer (Barney Miller, Charlie's Angels), natural causes.
Frank Giering, 38, German actor (Funny Games).
Pavel Lyubimov, 71, Russian film director.
Vernon Mendis, 84, Sri Lankan diplomat.
Mohammed Mzali, 84, Tunisian politician, Prime Minister (1980–1986).
Hiromu Naruse, 66, Japanese chief test driver for Toyota Motor Company, car crash.
Pete Quaife, 66, British bassist (The Kinks), kidney failure.
Peter Walker, Baron Walker of Worcester, 78, British politician and life peer, MP for Worcester (1961–1992), cancer.

24
Toni Adams, 45, American professional wrestling manager, former wife of Chris Adams, heart attack.
Sadri Ahmeti, 71, Albanian painter and poet.
Fred Anderson, 81, American jazz tenor saxophonist.
Rawshan Ara, 69, Bangladeshi film actress.
Armand Bernard, 82, Canadian Olympic wrestler.
JoJo Billingsley, 58, American back-up singer (Lynyrd Skynyrd), cancer.
Elise M. Boulding, 89, American sociologist, liver failure.
Lorn Brown, 71, American sports commentator (Chicago White Sox), heart failure.
Shirley Carr, 81, Canadian president of the Labour Congress.
Cherubim Dambui, 62, Papua New Guinean Premier of East Sepik (1976–1983), auxiliary bishop of Port Moresby (since 2000), kidney failure.
*Digvijay Singh, 54, Indian politician.
Francis Dreyfus, 70, French record producer (Disques Dreyfus).
Harry Enns, 78, Canadian politician, MLA for Rockwood-Iberville/Lakeside (1966–2003).
Don Enoch, 94, American politician, Mayor of Wichita, Kansas (1969–1970).
Bill Hudson, 77, American photojournalist, heart failure.
Alan Krueck, 70, American musicologist.
Kazimierz Paździor, 75, Polish Olympic gold medal-winning (1960) boxer.
Jean-Léonard Rugambage, Rwandan journalist, shot.
Walter Shorenstein, 95, American real estate developer and baseball team owner (San Francisco Giants), natural causes.
Ben Sonnenberg, 73, American journalist, multiple sclerosis.
Jean-Luc Tricoire, 57, French Olympic sports shooter.

25
Viveka Babajee, 37, Mauritian-born Indian model and actress, suicide by hanging.
Brian Flowers, Baron Flowers, 85, British physicist, academic and life peer.
F. Gwynplaine MacIntyre, 62, Welsh science fiction author, suicide.
Robert Nyman, 49, American politician, member of the Massachusetts House of Representatives (since 1999), drowning.
Alan Plater, 75, English television writer, cancer.
Richard B. Sellars, 94, American Chairman and CEO of Johnson & Johnson.
Peter Sliker, 86, American bass-baritone at the Metropolitan Opera
John A. Willis, 93, American editor of Theatre World.
Wu Guanzhong, 90, Chinese painter.

26
Algirdas Brazauskas, 77, Lithuanian politician, President (1993–1998); Prime Minister (2001–2006), lymphoma.
D. Page Elmore, 71, American politician, member of the Maryland House of Delegates (2003–2010), cancer.
Aldo Giuffrè, 86, Italian actor, peritonitis.
Alberto Guzik, 66, Brazilian actor and writer, stomach cancer.
Paulo Teixeira Jorge, 82, Angolan politician, Minister of External Relations (1976–1984).
Charles Spencer King, 85, English automotive engineer (Rover SD1, Range Rover), complications following a traffic accident.
Harald Keres, 97, Estonian physicist.
Shoista Mullojonova, 84, Tajik singer, heart attack.
Akira Nakamura, 76, Japanese historian.
Adoor Pankajam, 81, Indian actress.
Conrad Poe, 62, Filipino actor, stroke.
Benny Powell, 80, American jazz trombonist (April in Paris), heart attack following spinal surgery.
Jonathan Smith, 43, British games developer.
D. Sudarsanam, 68, Indian politician, multiple organ dysfunction syndrome.
Sergio Vega, 40, Mexican banda singer, shot.
Stanley Wagner, 83, American winemaker.
Sir John Ward, 85, British politician, MP for Poole (1979–1997).
Vasyl Yevseyev, 47, Ukrainian football coach, suicide by jumping.

27
Corey Allen, 75, American actor (Rebel Without a Cause), film and television director, complications of Parkinson's disease.
Leif Alsheimer, 57, Swedish lawyer, lecturer and author.
Dolph Briscoe, 87, American politician, Governor of Texas (1973–1979), kidney failure and pneumonia.
Ken Coates, 79, British politician and writer, suspected heart attack.
Édgar García de Dios, 32, Mexican footballer, shot.
João Gonçalves Filho, 75, Brazilian Olympic swimmer and water polo player.
Martin D. Ginsburg, 78, American attorney, husband of Ruth Bader Ginsburg, cancer.
Edo Mulahalilović, 46, Bosnian musician.
Andreas Okopenko, 80, Austrian writer.

28
Claude Anderson, 86, Australian footballer.
Bill Aucoin, 66, American band manager (Kiss), complications from prostate cancer.
Leo Bernier, 81, Canadian politician.
Peter Bowers, 80, Australian journalist, Alzheimer's disease.
Robert Byrd, 92, American politician, U.S. Representative (1953–1959), Senator from West Virginia (1959–2010).
Clement Finch, 94, American hematologist.
Nicolas Hayek, 82, Swiss entrepreneur, founder and chairman of The Swatch Group, heart failure.
Kirsten Heisig, 48, German politician and juvenile magistrate, suicide.
Willie Huber, 52, German-born Canadian ice hockey player (Detroit Red Wings), heart attack.
Chandrakant Kamat, 76, Indian Hindustani classical tabla player, heart attack.
Louis Moyroud, 96, French-born American inventor of phototypesetting.
Rammellzee, 49, American hip hop musician and graffiti artist, after long illness.
Joya Sherrill, 85, American jazz vocalist, leukemia.
William L. Taylor, 78, American attorney and civil rights advocate, complications from a fall.
Rodolfo Torre Cantú, 46, Mexican politician, candidate for Governor of Tamaulipas, shot.

29
Blair Barnes, 49, Canadian ice hockey player (Los Angeles Kings), heart attack.
Ron Gans, 79, American voice actor (Transformers, Welcome to Pooh Corner, Dumbo's Circus), complications from pneumonia.
Rudolf Leopold, 85, Austrian art collector.
Doug Ohlson, 73, American painter, complications from a fall.
Queen Jane, 45, Kenyan musician, meningitis.
Chandgi Ram, 72, Indian Olympic wrestler, cardiac arrest.
Frank Rigney, 74, American-born Canadian football player (Winnipeg Blue Bombers).
Pietro Taricone, 35, Italian actor and reality show contestant (Grande Fratello), parachute accident.

30
Brian Ash, 73-74, British writer, scientific journalist, and editor.
Bruno Côté, 69, Canadian landscape painter, prostate cancer.
Ditta Zusa Einzinger, 79, Austrian singer (Lolita), cancer.
Elliott Kastner, 80, American film producer (Where Eagles Dare), cancer.
Harry Klein, 81, British jazz saxophonist.
Juhani Kyöstilä, 78, Finnish Olympic basketball player.
Noel Marshall, 79, American film director and producer.
Serigne Mouhamadou Lamine Bara Mbacké, 85, Senegalese Grand Marabout of the Mourides.
Denny Moyer, 70, American world light middleweight champion boxer.
Gordon Mulholland, 89, British actor.
*Park Yong-ha, 32, South Korean actor and singer, suicide by hanging.

References

2010-06
 06